Hallervorden is a German surname. Notable people with the surname include:

 Dieter Hallervorden (born 1935), German comedian, actor, singer, and cabaret artist
 Julius Hallervorden (1882–1965), German physician and neuroscientist

German-language surnames